The EMS Stadium, located in Kozhikode, Kerala, India., is a multi-purpose stadium that is primarily used for football matches. The stadium is home to the I-League team Gokulam Kerala FC, as well as the Indian Women's League team Gokulam Kerala FC (Women). Built in 1977, the stadium has the capacity to hold 50,000 spectators. It is named after the communist leader E.M.S Namboodiripad, who was the first Chief Minister of Kerala. The stadium is famous for its passionate football fans and has played host to several important football tournaments such as the Scissors Cup finals, Super Cup finals, Santhosh Trophy, and Sait Nagjee Football tournament. The Gokulam Kerala team has been playing their home matches at the EMS Stadium since 2017 and has had a successful run at the stadium winning their first I-League home match against East Bengal FC with a score of 2–1, and Shillong Lajong FC with a score of 3–2. The stadium is considered as a historic and important venue for football in the region and continues to attract large crowds for various matches and tournaments.

Renovations
The EMS Stadium in Kozhikode, Kerala, India is a multi-purpose sports facility that has undergone significant renovations over the years to improve its infrastructure and facilities. In 2005, the stadium underwent a renovation to host State Bank of Travancore National Football League matches. Another renovation was done in 2011 in preparation for the National Games in 2012, with the Corporation of Kozhikode and the government investing around 18 Crore for the upgrade.

The new design of the stadium, by RK Ramesh, includes state-of-the-art amenities such as a VVIP lounge with a seating capacity of 200, dressing rooms, media center, and other facilities. The grandstand pavilion was also upgraded for the National Games in 2012, and the stadium was fitted with improved floodlights to ensure high-quality matches. The EMS Stadium has been renovated to be an international standard stadium for both football and cricket.

The stadium is also equipped with modern facilities like VIP seating arrangements, food courts, and washrooms. The stadium has also installed CCTV cameras for security and safety measures. The stadium is easily accessible to public transport and have enough parking space.

There are plans to lease the stadium to the Kerala Cricket Association while the Kerala Football Association would like to have control of the stadium. With its excellent facilities and infrastructure, the EMS Stadium is a premier sports venue in Kerala and continues to host a wide range of sporting events, including football and cricket matches, as well as other events such as concerts and festivals.

Football
It was the home ground of Viva Kerala FC in the I-league, though now Kerala United FC is the team from Kozhikode trying to get into I League. It was also the home ground of Gokulam Kerala FC in the I-league.

This stadium is famous for the football crazy fans of Kozhikode. Famous scissors cup finals, super cup finals, Santhosh Trophy, Sait Nagjee Football Tournament is held here.
The stadium is the home ground for Gokulam Kerala team in I-League since 2017.  Gokulam Kerala  had won their first I-League home match against East Bengal FC for 2–1 and Shillong Lajong FC for 3–2.

Major football matches hosted

1980 AFC Women's Championship
1980 AFC Women's Asian Cup previously called Women's Championship Football, which the Indian team won silver was held here.

1987 Nehru Cup
The stadium hosted the 1987 Nehru Cup, which was won by the Soviet Union

Sait Nagjee Football Tournament
2016 Sait Nagjee Trophy Teams

National Games
The stadium hosted football matches for the 35th National Games.

Other uses

Cricket
It also hosted the veterans of India and Pakistan cricket match in which legends like Ijaz Ahmed, Syed Kirmani and others played. In 1994, touring West Indies had taken Mumbai in a three-day encounter. West Indies were dismissed for 176 and Bombay ended the day at 53/2. The match, however, had to be called off after the opening day owing to law and order problems in the wake of a bandh.

Other Event
It also hosted many cultural events held at Kozhikode like malabar mahotsavam.
It also hosted the inaugural performance of world tour of A. R. Rahman, the Academy Award–winning musician.

Accessibility

The Kozhikode EMS Stadium is located in the heart of the city. It lies beside the Pavamani Road between Rajaji road and New Bus stand, a common stretch among many city bus routes. The Stadium Mavoor Road from the Western side allows access from Mananchira and Arayadathupalam, although there is no public transport along this route. The stadium is situated at 2.5 km  from the Kozhikode railway station and railway stations respectively.

See also
 List of association football stadiums by capacity

References

External links
EMS Stadium at CrickInfo

1977 establishments in Kerala
Buildings and structures in Kozhikode
Chirag United Club Kerala
Cricket grounds in Kerala
Football venues in Kerala
Gokulam Kerala FC
Sport in Kozhikode
Sports venues completed in 1977
Sports venues in Kerala
20th-century architecture in India